Genneya Walton (born February 22, 1999) is an American actress. She is known for playing Bryden Bandweth in Project Mc2, and Chloe Barris in BlackAF.

Early life and career 
Genneya Walton was born in Chicago, Illinois. She started her career as a dancer at the age of 7. In 2019, she was cast for a role as Chloe Barris in Netflix television series BlackAF alongside Kenya Barris and Rashida Jones.

Filmography

References

External links 
 

1999 births
Living people
African-American actresses
Actresses from Chicago
21st-century African-American people
21st-century African-American women